The following lists events that happened during 1923 in the Union of Soviet Socialist Republics.

Incumbents
 General Secretary of the Communist Party of the Soviet Union – Joseph Stalin
 Chairman of the Central Executive Committee of the Congress of Soviets – Mikhail Kalinin
 Chairman of the Council of People's Commissars of the Soviet Union – Vladimir Lenin

Events

April
 17–25 April – 12th Congress of the Russian Communist Party (Bolsheviks)

June
 16 June – The Yakut Revolt ends with the defeat of the White Army.

October
 15 October – The Declaration of 46 is sent.

Births
 9 January – Eduard Kolmanovsky, People's Artist of the USSR
 11 August – Maxim Grabovenko, Hero of the Soviet Union
 13 September – Zoya Kosmodemyanskaya, Hero of the Soviet Union
 26 September – Aleksandr Alov, film director
 29 September – Aleksei Fedorovich Filippov, mathematician
 31 October – Ivan Otmakhov, Hero of the Soviet Union
 9 November – Viktor Turbin, Hero of the Soviet Union
 11 November – Isaac Trachtenberg, Hygienist
 22 November – Yury Nikandrov, Olympic shooter
 29 November – Inna Zubkovskaya, ballerina
 14 December – Akhsarbek Abaev, Hero of the Soviet Union

See also
 1923 in fine arts of the Soviet Union
 List of Soviet films of 1923

References

 
1920s in the Soviet Union
Years in the Soviet Union
Soviet Union
Soviet Union
Soviet Union